Robert S. Carlson was an American football and baseball player and coach.  He served as the head football coach at Augsburg College from 1940 to 1941 and again in 1946 and at the Municipal University of Wichita—now Wichita State University—from 1951 to 1952, compiling a career college football record of 8–30–1.

Head coaching record

Football

References

Year of birth missing
Year of death missing
American football ends
Augsburg Auggies football coaches
Augsburg Auggies men's basketball coaches
Minnesota Golden Gophers baseball players
Minnesota Golden Gophers football players
Wichita State Shockers baseball coaches
Wichita State Shockers football coaches